Ganpatrao Deshmukh (10 August 1927 – 30 July 2021) was an Indian politician. He was in office for 54 years. He was called "Abasaheb" by the people with love and affection. He was also called "Bhai" by peasants and workers.

Biography
He was the leader of Peasants and Workers Party of India (PWP). He is the longest serving member of the Maharashtra Legislative Assembly have been elected 11 times, during the last 54 years, from  Sangola in Solapur district. Deshmukh also briefly served as a minister in the First Sharad Pawar ministry in 1978, and later in 1999, when PWP supported the Congress-NCP alliance.

Deshmukh was first elected to the State Assembly in the 1962 elections, and since then won every election, except for the 1972 and 1995 elections. In 2012, the government and the Assembly congratulated him upon his completing 50 years as a member.

In the 2014 Maharashtra Legislative Assembly election at the age of eighty-eight, he won the Sangola constituency for  a record 11th time with 94,374 votes.

References

1927 births
2021 deaths
Peasants and Workers Party of India politicians
Leaders of the Opposition in the Maharashtra Legislative Assembly
People from Solapur district
Maharashtra MLAs 1962–1967
Maharashtra MLAs 1967–1972
Maharashtra MLAs 1978–1980
Maharashtra MLAs 1985–1990
Maharashtra MLAs 1990–1995
Maharashtra MLAs 1999–2004
Maharashtra MLAs 2004–2009
Maharashtra MLAs 2009–2014
State cabinet ministers of Maharashtra